Albert D. Wright (December 10, 1842 – February 15, 1926) was an American soldier who fought in the Union Army in the American Civil War. He was awarded the Medal of Honor for his actions at the Siege of Petersburg. He is buried at Greenwood Cemetery in Eustis, Florida. His medal is stored at Atlanta History Center.

Medal of Honor Citation 
For extraordinary heroism on 30 July 1864, in action at Petersburg, Virginia. Captain Wright advanced beyond the enemy's lines, capturing a stand of colors and its color guard; was severely wounded.

Date Issued: 1 May, 1893

References 

American Civil War recipients of the Medal of Honor
United States Army Medal of Honor recipients
1842 births
1926 deaths